Croot is a surname. Notable people with the surname include:

Ernest S. Croot III (born 1972), American mathematician
Estelle Maria Croot (born 1964), now known as Estelle Asmodelle, Australia's first legal transsexual
Fred Croot (1885–1958), English footballer